The 1988 Cal Poly Mustangs football team represented California Polytechnic State University during the 1988 NCAA Division II football season.

Cal Poly competed in the Western Football Conference (WFC). The Mustangs were led by second-year head coach Lyle Setencich and played home games at Mustang Stadium in San Luis Obispo, California. They finished the season with a record of five wins, four losses and one tie (5–4–1, 3–3 WFC). Overall, the team outscored its opponents 238–145 for the season.

Schedule

Team players in the NFL
The following Cal Poly Mustang players were selected in the 1989 NFL Draft.

Notes

References

Cal Poly
Cal Poly Mustangs football seasons
Cal Poly Mustangs football